The spectacled longbill (Oedistoma iliolophus), also known as dwarf longbill, plumed longbill or dwarf honeyeater, is a species of bird in the family Melanocharitidae.
It is found in New Guinea.
Its natural habitats are subtropical or tropical dry forest, subtropical or tropical moist lowland forest, and subtropical or tropical moist montane forest.

References

dwarf longbill
Birds of New Guinea
spectacled longbill
Taxonomy articles created by Polbot
Endemic fauna of New Guinea